Kurt Dreyer (31 July 1909 in Bielefeld, Germany – 29 September 1981 in Johannesburg, South Africa) was a German–South African chess master.

Dreyer emigrated from Germany due to the country's Nazi policies. He was South African Champion in 1937 (after a play-off) and 1947 (jointly with Wolfgang Heidenfeld). 
He took 15th at Dublin 1957 (zonal, Ludek Pachman won).

He married Eva Dreyer and had 2 children, Frank and Kenneth Dreyer.

Dreyer represented South Africa in Chess Olympiads at Munich 1958, Tel Aviv 1964, Havana 1966, and Siegen 1970.

References

External links

1909 births
1981 deaths
German chess players
South African chess players
Jewish chess players
20th-century chess players
Jewish emigrants from Nazi Germany to South Africa